Myeloid/lymphoid or mixed-lineage leukemia 4, also known as MLL4, is a human gene.

This gene encodes a protein which contains multiple domains including a CXXC zinc finger, three PHD zinc fingers, two FY-rich domains, and a SET (suppressor of variegation, enhancer of zeste, and trithorax) domain. The SET domain is a conserved C-terminal domain that characterizes proteins of the MLL (mixed-lineage leukemia) family. This gene is ubiquitously expressed in adult tissues. It is also amplified in solid tumor cell lines, and may be involved in human cancer. Two alternatively spliced transcript variants encoding distinct isoforms have been reported for this gene, however, the full length nature of the shorter transcript is not known.

References

Further reading

External links 
 

Transcription factors